Oscar E. Morehouse (August 5, 1857 – January 1, 1935) was a Canadian medical doctor and Conservative political figure. He represented York County in the New Brunswick provincial legislature from 1911 to 1917.

A graduate of McGill Medical School, he practiced family medicine in the Kedgwick Ridge area of New Brunswick. Morehouse was first elected in a 1911 by-election held following the death of Thomas Robison. He was re-elected in the 1912 general and retired from politics to return to his medical practice at the dissolution of the 33rd Legislature in 1917.

Morehouse's granddaughter, Patricia Crossman, would also sit in the legislature as the Progressive Conservative member for Riverview from 1999 to her death in 2002.

References

1857 births
1935 deaths
Conservative Party of New Brunswick MLCs
McGill University Faculty of Medicine alumni